Rose Keegan is a British actress of stage, film and television. She trained at the Royal Central School of Speech and Drama. Her mother is the writer Susanne Keegan. Her father was the writer and military historian Sir John Keegan.

Selected credits

Theatre

 Susan in Abigail's Party by Mike Leigh directed by Sarah Esdaile - ATG Tour
 Susan in Abigail's Party by Mike Leigh directed by Sarah Esdaile - Theatre Royal Bath/Tour
 Andy in Stepping Out by Richard Harris directed by Maria Friedman - Theatre Royal Bath/Tour
 Cunegonde in Candide, at the Gate Theatre, directed by David Farr
 Linda in A Message for the Brokenhearted, at Liverpool Playhouse/BAC, written by Gregory Motton and directed by Ramin Gray
 Norma in The Revengers Comedies, at the Strand Theatre, written and directed by Sir Alan Ayckbourn
 Susannah in Bedroom Farce, Aldwych Theatre, written by Sir Alan Ayckbourn and directed by Loveday Ingram
 Model Girl in The Ghost is Here, New National Theatre, Tokyo, directed by Kazuyoshi Kushida 
 Lana in Hushabye Mountain, at the Hampstead Theatre, written by Jonathan Harvey, directed by Paul Miller
 Comedy Satire and Deeper Meaning at The Gate Theatre written by Gregory Motton and directed by David Farr
 The Countess in The Beelzebub Sonata at The Gate Theatre directed by Duncan Ward

Film

 Hope Gap written and directed by William Nicholson
 Thunderbirds, directed by Jonathan Frakes
 Match Point, directed by Woody Allen
 
 Magicians, directed by Andrew O'Connor
The Mirror Crack'd
Harry Potter and the Deathly Hallows – Part 1

Television
 Catwalk Dogs (ITV 1),
 Lilies (BBC 1),
 Hearts and Bones (BBC1),
 Gimme Gimme Gimme (BBC 2),
 Black Books (Channel 4),
 Miss Marple (BBC1).

References

External links

Alumni of the Royal Central School of Speech and Drama
British film actresses
British stage actresses
British television actresses
Living people
Year of birth missing (living people)